Foreman is an unincorporated community in Sequoyah County, Oklahoma, United States.

History
Foreman was named for merchant Zack Foreman and had its own post office from October 31, 1898, until August 31, 1936.

Notable persons
Hooks Foreman, professional baseball player, was born in Foreman.
Zack Foreman, professional baseball player, was born in Foreman.

Notes

Unincorporated communities in Sequoyah County, Oklahoma
Unincorporated communities in Oklahoma